Software Ideas Modeler is a CASE and an UML tool. The modeler supports all 14 diagram types specified in UML 2.5. It also supports among others the following diagrams and standards:

 ER diagrams
 BPMN 2.0
 CMMN
 SysML 1.5
 ArchiMate 3
 JSD
 CRC
 flowcharts 
 data flow diagram
 Infographics
 Wireframes
 Mind maps
 User Stories
 Roadmaps
 ORM (Object-role_modeling)
 Decision Model and Notation
 Gantt chart
 Nassi–Shneiderman diagram
 C4 model

Software Ideas Modeler is the work of Slovak software developer Dušan Rodina. The software is written in C#.

Exports
There is an export to raster image formats (BMP, GIF, JPG, PNG, TIFF), vector image formats (Windows Metafile, SVG) and PDF.

There is also export to XMI.

Imports
There is an import from XMI.

Supported programming languages
There is an export to:
ActionScript
C#
C++
Dart
Object Pascal (Delphi)
Java
JavaScript
PHP
Python
Ruby
SQL
Visual Basic
Visual Basic .NET
XML Schema

There is an import from:
C#
C++
Java
PHP
Ruby
Visual Basic .NET

See also
List of UML tools

References

External links
 
 Review
 Download software at CNet

UML tools
Windows graphics-related software
Graphics-related software for Linux
Diagramming software
vector graphics editors
Data modeling tools
Workflow applications
Information technology management
Cross-platform software
Portable software
Computer-aided software engineering tools
Software for modeling software